Mentha dahurica, or Dahurian thyme, is a mint species within the genus Mentha, native to Siberia, the Russian Far East, Japan, and northeastern China.

The epithet honors the Daur people of Inner Mongolia.

References

dahurica
Flora of China
Flora of Japan
Flora of Siberia
Flora of the Russian Far East
Plants described in 1833